Hymel Hunt (born 14 November 1993) is a Samoa international rugby league footballer who plays as a er for the Newcastle Knights in the NRL.

He previously played for the Gold Coast Titans, Melbourne Storm and the South Sydney Rabbitohs in the National Rugby League.

Background
Hunt was born in Auckland, New Zealand, and is of Samoan descent. He moved to Queensland, Australia at a young age.

He played his junior rugby league for the Redcliffe Dolphins, before being signed by the Gold Coast Titans.

Hunt is the cousin of Queensland Reds player and former Brisbane Broncos player Karmichael Hunt, and former South Sydney Rabbitohs teammate Kirisome Auva'a.

Playing career

Early career
From 2011 to 2013, Hunt played for the Gold Coast Titans' NYC team. On 21 April 2012, he played for the Queensland under-20s team against the New South Wales under-20s team.

2013
In Round 17 of the 2013 NRL season, Hunt made his NRL debut for the Gold Coast Titans against the Penrith Panthers. In April 2013, he again played for the Queensland under-20s team against the New South Wales under-20s team. On 27 August 2013, he was named at centre in the 2013 NYC Team of the Year. On 21 August 2013, he signed a 1-year contract with the Melbourne Storm starting in 2014. On 13 October 2013, Hunt played for the Junior Kangaroos.

2014
In 2014, Hunt received a two-match suspension from the NRL after being found to have placed a bet on NRL matches. He re-signed with the Storm for 2015.

2015
Hunt made his Melbourne debut in Round 14 of the 2015 NRL season against the Parramatta Eels, scoring a try on debut. After the 2015 season, he was released by the Storm. On 20 December, he signed a one-year contract with South Sydney starting in 2016.

2016
In round 1 of the 2016 NRL season, Hunt made his club debut for the South Sydney club against the Sydney Roosters, playing at centre and scoring a try in South Sydney's 42–10 win at the Sydney Football Stadium.

2017
Hunt had a season plagued by injury in 2017 limiting him to only 12 appearances for the year.

2018
Hunt made 21 appearances for Souths and scored seven tries as the club finished 3rd on the table at the end of the regular season and made it all the way to the preliminary final before being defeated by Sydney Roosters 12–4.

On 12 November, Hunt signed a one-year contract with the Newcastle Knights starting in 2019.

2019
Hunt made 24 appearances for Newcastle and scored nine tries in the 2019 NRL season as the club missed out on the finals finishing a disappointing 11th place.

2020
Hunt made 20 appearances for Newcastle and scored eight tries in the 2020 NRL season, as the club made their first finals appearance since 2013 where Newcastle lost 46-20 in week 1 of finals against South Sydney, where Hunt scored two tries in the loss.

Due to his form throughout 2020, Hunt was rewarded with being selected in Queensland 27 man squad, where he played no games in the 2-1 upset series win.

2021
Hunt played 17 games for Newcastle in the 2021 NRL season including the club's elimination finals loss against Parramatta.

References

External links
Newcastle Knights profile
South Sydney Rabbitohs profile
Melbourne Storm profile

1993 births
Living people
Eastern Suburbs Tigers players
Gold Coast Titans players
Melbourne Storm players
New Zealand rugby league players
New Zealand sportspeople of Samoan descent
North Sydney Bears NSW Cup players
Newcastle Knights players
Junior Kangaroos players
Redcliffe Dolphins players
Rugby league centres
Rugby league players from Auckland
Rugby league wingers
Samoa national rugby league team players
South Sydney Rabbitohs players
Sunshine Coast Falcons players
New Zealand emigrants to Australia